An adventure is an exciting experience that is typically bold, sometimes risky, undertaking.

Adventure or The Adventure may also refer to:

Arts, entertainment, and media

Gaming

Games
 Adventure (1980 video game), a video game for the Atari 2600
 Adventure (1982 video game), an 8-bit computer game published in the UK by Micro Power
 Adventure!, a 2001 pulp fiction role-playing game by White Wolf
 Colossal Cave Adventure, also known as Adventure, a 1977 text adventure computer game for the PDP-10

Other uses in gaming
 Adventure, another term for an expansion pack
 Adventure (Dungeons & Dragons), a module or scenario for Dungeons & Dragons
 Adventure International, an American video game publisher
 The Adventure Company, a Canadian video game publisher

Genres
 Adventure (role-playing games), a scripted plot line in role-playing games
 Adventure game, a computer game genre
 Adventure fiction, a narrative genre
 Adventure film, a film genre

Films
 Adventure (1925 film), an American silent film by Victor Fleming
 Adventure (1936 film), a Swedish film directed by Per-Axel Branner
 Adventure (1946 film), an American film starring Clark Gable and Greer Garson
 Adventure (2011 film), a Hungarian film
 L'Avventura (The Adventure), a 1960 Italian film directed by Michelangelo Antonioni
 The Adventure (1974 film) (Al-Mughamara), a Syrian film

Literature
 Adventure (novel), 1911 novel by Jack London
 The Adventures, a series of novels in the Forgotten Realms of Dungeons & Dragons

Music

Groups
 Adventures (band), an American rock band
 The Adventures, a Northern Irish rock band

Albums 
 Adventure (Furslide album)
 Adventure (Madeon album)
 Adventure (Shonen Knife album)
 Adventure (Television album)
 Adventures (album), a 1984 album by T-Square

Songs
 "Adventure", by Be Your Own Pet from Be Your Own Pet, 2006
 "Adventure", by Cheat Codes, 2015
 "Adventure" (Eleanor song), 1988
 "Adventures", by Kid Cudi from Speedin' Bullet 2 Heaven, 2015
 "Adventure", by Matthew Parker from Adventure, 2016
 "Adventure", by Momoko Kikuchi, 1986
 "Adventure" (Yoasobi song), 2023
 "The Adventure", by Angels & Airwaves, 2006

Television
 Adventure (TV series), a 1953 documentary series on CBS
 Adventure Inc., a 2002 television series
 Adventure Time, an American animated series

Other uses in arts, entertainment, and media
 Adventure (magazine), a pulp (and later true-story) magazine from 1910 to 1971
 Adventure Comics, a comic book series published by DC Comics from 1935 to 1983

Geography 
 Adventure, Guyana, a village
 Adventure Creek, a river in Alaska

Transportation

Aircraft
 Adventure F series, a French line of paramotors
 Adventure SA, a French manufacturer of paramotors
 Trike Icaros Adventure S, a Brazilian ultralight trike design

Ships
 Adventure (ship), one of numerous vessels named Adventure
 , several ships of the Royal Navy

Other uses in transportation
 Mitsubishi Adventure or Freeca, a compact MPV sold in the Philippines

See also
 Adventures Unlimited (disambiguation)
 Adventure Aquarium